Alfred Lamb (28 May 1845 – 13 October 1890) was an Australian businessman, banker and politician. In 1889 he was elected to the New South Wales Legislative Assembly as a Free Trade member for West Sydney. He served in this office until his death in Potts Point in 1890. A member of the Lamb banking family, he became a director of the Commercial Banking Company of Sydney (now National Australia Bank) in 1860.

His father Commander John Lamb was a Commercial Banking Company of Sydney director, as were his brothers Walter Lamb, Edward Lamb and John de Villiers Lamb. His sister-in-law by John de Villiers Lamb, Henrietta Lamb, was the sister of the deputy chairman of the Commercial Banking Company of Sydney, Thomas Smith. His sister-in-law via Walter was Margaret Dangar, daughter of Australian politician and explorer Henry Dangar.

Early life
He was born in London to the banker and politician John Lamb and Emma (née Robinson). His mother Emma Lamb (née Robinson) was the daughter of the deputy chairman of Lloyds Bank. His family migrated to Sydney in 1829, and, after his education, Lamb became a clerk in his father's mercantile firm and became a partner in 1847. At 15 he became a clerk in his father's firm and at 22 a partner in Lamb, Spry & Co.

Career

A key figure in the Employers' Union, he was elected to the New South Wales Legislative Assembly in 1889 as a Free Trade member for West Sydney, but he died at Potts Point the following year.

Further details

On 25 February 1868 he married Mary Elizabeth Gordon, with whom he had seven children; a second marriage on 4 May 1881 to Mary Frances Brenan produced a further four children.

References

 

1845 births
1890 deaths
Members of the New South Wales Legislative Assembly
Free Trade Party politicians
19th-century Australian politicians